Luke, the Chauffeur is a 1916 American short comedy film starring Harold Lloyd.

Cast
 Harold Lloyd as Luke
 Snub Pollard
 Bebe Daniels
 Charles Stevenson (as Charles E. Stevenson)
 Billy Fay
 Fred C. Newmeyer
 Sammy Brooks
 Harry Todd
 Bud Jamison
 Margaret Joslin (as Mrs. Harry Todd)

See also
 Harold Lloyd filmography

References

External links

1916 films
1916 comedy films
1916 short films
Silent American comedy films
American silent short films
American black-and-white films
Chauffeurs
Films directed by Hal Roach
Lonesome Luke films
American comedy short films
1910s American films